Gerald Francis Kember (born 15 November 1945) is a former rugby union player from New Zealand. A fullback and second five-eighth, Kember represented Wellington at a provincial level, and was a member of the New Zealand national side, the All Blacks, from 1967 to 1970. He played 19 matches for the All Blacks including one international.

Kember was educated at Nelson College from 1959 to 1963, playing in the 1st XV rugby team in 1962 and 1963, and the 1st XI cricket team from 1960 to 1963. He captained both teams in 1963.

References

1945 births
Living people
New Zealand rugby union players
New Zealand international rugby union players
People educated at Nelson College
20th-century New Zealand lawyers
Victoria University of Wellington alumni
Rugby union fullbacks
Rugby union centres
Rugby union players from Wellington City